Driss Moussaid (born March 29, 1988) is a boxer from Morocco who won bronze at the World Junior Championships 2006 and qualified for the Olympics 2008 at junior welter.

Career
He won a bronze medal in 2006 at the world junior championship in his native country when he lost the semi to eventual Hungarian winner Balazs Bacskai. At the Olympic qualifier he edged out All Africa champ Hastings Bwalya and also beat Hamza Hassini. Moussaid beat Todd Kidd of Australia in the Men's Light Welter (64 kg) on the second day of the 2008 Beijing Olympics.

References

External links
Qualifier
Yahoo profile

Living people
1988 births
Light-welterweight boxers
Boxers at the 2008 Summer Olympics
Olympic boxers of Morocco
Moroccan male boxers